Progressive Britain, formerly known as Progress, is a political organisation associated with the British Labour Party, founded in 1996 to support the New Labour leadership of Tony Blair. It is seen as being on the right of the party.

Progress merged with Policy Network in May 2021 to form Progressive Britain. Progressive Britain organises conferences and other events. It provides training and mentoring for likeminded candidates seeking selection as Labour MPs.

Aims 
Until 2014 Progress stated it was "the New Labour pressure group which aims to promote a radical and progressive politics for the 21st century." From late 2014 Progress stopped using the "New Labour" label and rebranded itself as "Labour's new mainstream, aim[ing] to promote a radical and progressive politics".

Its aims are:

History 
Progress was founded in 1996 by Paul Richards, Liam Byrne and Derek Draper, the former aide to Peter Mandelson, as an organisation to maintain a dialogue with Labour's new leadership under Tony Blair. It has organised many events and conferences, and hosted several important speeches by senior party figures. Its annual conference has become a staple of the political calendar with many cabinet ministers and other leading politicians attending.

In May 2014 Progress dropped using the "New Labour" label, introduced by Tony Blair, for the Labour party.

In February 2019, a group of MPs left the Labour Party and founded The Independent Group. All seven founding members of this group were members of Progress and regularly contributed to the work of the organisation.

On 16 May 2021, Progress announced that it was merging with thinktank Policy Network to form an organisation named Progressive Britain which would be "dedicated to the intellectual revitalisation of the centre-left" and "championing the revival of progressive social democracy".

Publications 
Progress publishes a monthly magazine and a large number of political pamphlets.

Progress also published The Purple Book, in September 2011, exploring fresh non-statist policies for Labour. Authors included: Alan Milburn, Peter Mandelson, Jacqui Smith, Tessa Jowell, Andrew Adonis, Caroline Flint, Douglas Alexander, Frank Field, Liam Byrne, Ivan Lewis, Rachel Reeves, Tristram Hunt, Liz Kendall and Jenny Chapman. There were ideas such as foundation trusts providing GP services, a school voucher system, crime commissioners, directly elected mayors and 'hasbos'. The Labour Party leader at the time, Ed Miliband, wrote a foreword to the book.

Links with Labour First
Historically, Progress had little connection with Labour First, an older Labour party factional organisation on the right of the Labour party. The rise of Jeremy Corbyn and Momentum in the Labour Party saw Progress and Labour First, while remaining distinct organisations with different traditions, carry out more joint activities, including joint endorsement of candidates in internal party elections.

During the 2020 Labour Party leadership election, Labour First formed a joint venture with Progress called Reclaiming Labour, holding meetings around the country analysing why Labour lost heavily in the 2019 United Kingdom general election.

In April 2020, immediately on the election of Keir Starmer as party leader, Labour First and Progress launched jointly a new umbrella organisation called ‘Labour to Win’, with goals including 'to bring about fundamental change in the party's culture and organisation '.

Labour to Win endorsed candidates in the 2020 Labour National Executive Committee elections, however owing to the newly adopted Single Transferable Vote nature of the elections, and in the spirit of electing a pluralisitic NEC, the organisation chose only to endorse six of its own candidates and also to endorse three candidates politically more to the left than Labour To Win but who had a commitment to broad church Labour politics.

Funding 
Data from the Electoral Commission shows that between 2001 and August 2019, Progress received almost £4.7 million in donations. Of this £3.5 million came from Lord Sainsbury, who stopped funding Progress in 2017. Another source reported that Lord Sainsbury had contributed £2 million of the £3 million of donations and sponsorship to Progress from 2001 to 2011. In 2014 Progress was fined £6,000 by the Electoral Commission for accepting donations of £390,000 from Lord Sainsbury while he was not on a UK electoral register, between December 2011 and April 2013.  During 2016 he had donated £260,000. After the 2017 general election Lord Sainsbury announced he will no longer provide financial backing to Progress.

The second largest donor to Progress during this period is listed by the Electoral Commission as a "Permissible Donor Exempt Trust" set up in the name of Lord Michael Montague, which made donations to Progress for two years following his death.

The British Private Equity and Venture Capital Association has given Progress £57,000.

It was reported in 2012 that Progress had received more money than both the Green Party and Plaid Cymru, and that it had received more than 122 times more funding than any other members' association within the Labour Party. This level of funding has led to accusations that Progress is operating as a "party within a party".

Criticism
In 2012, Progress was at the centre of the debate over the direction of the Labour Party under Ed Miliband, after a widely circulated anonymous report called for Labour's national executive to "determine the organisational nature of Progress, and whether or not this form of organisation is acceptable inside the Labour Party." Criticism of Progress had concentrated on the generous funding that Progress had secured from external donors, and on its positioning, regarded as being on the right of the Labour Party. Following circulation of the report, the GMB General Secretary Paul Kenny led calls at the 2012 Labour conference for Progress to be "effectively… (outlawed)…as part of the Labour Party." In response, a Labour Party statement said, "We are a party that is reaching out to people, gaining new supporters and offering real change for the country in these tough times. The Labour Party is a broad church and we are not in the business of excluding people." Labour leader Ed Miliband was also clearly in support, telling The Independent that "I believe in an open and inclusive party, reaching out to people, not for pushing people away. That certainly does not mean excluding or proscribing organisations like Progress which contribute to the debate."

In 2013, Len McCluskey, general secretary of Unite the Union, claimed Progress was manipulating the selection procedures for Labour parliamentary candidates to get its candidates selected. Progress responded: "Progress helps to train and mentor candidates going for selection, to whom we do not give money. The details are open, plainly explained on our website and approved by a strategy board elected by our members."

Personnel

Chairs and board members 
Progress is chaired by Alison McGovern. In 2014 its vice-chairs were the Labour MPs Jenny Chapman, Stephen Doughty, Julie Elliott, Tristram Hunt, Dan Jarvis, Liz Kendall, Seema Malhotra, Toby Perkins, Lucy Powell, Steve Reed, Jonathan Reynolds and Nick Smith.

Progress's honorary president is former Minister Stephen Twigg, previously the organization's chair.

Progress is constituted as a private company limited by guarantee, with a legal board of directors in 2012 consisting of Jennifer Gerber, Jonathan Mendelsohn, Robert Philpot and Stephen Twigg.

Prior to 2015 Progress was chaired by MP John Woodcock, and prior to 2014 by former Minister Lord Adonis. Prior to 2012 Progress was chaired by MP and former Minister Stephen Twigg, and the honorary president was Alan Milburn, the former Secretary of State for Health. Jonathan Mendelsohn was treasurer of Progress.

Strategy Board 
Progress announced the creation of the first strategy board in July 2012, to enable the organisation's 'growing membership to feel a true sense of engagement'. The first elections were held in August 2012.  The most recent elections were held in 2016.

Current members of the Progress strategy board are:

 Alison McGovern MP (chair)
 Gloria De Piero 
 Peter Mandelson
 Phil Wilson
 Rachael Saunders
 James Beckles
 Jonathan Hawkes
 Joanne Harding
 Rachael Saunders
 Christabel Cooper
 Sheila Gilmore
 John Hannett
 Mary Wimbury
 Liron Velleman

Directors 
Since its inception Progress has had a number of operational directors:
 Derek Draper (former aide to Peter Mandelson)
 Darren Murphy (former Special Adviser)
 Patrick Diamond (former Special Adviser)
 Jennifer Gerber
 Jessica Asato (acting director)
 Robert Philpot (retired October 2014)
 Richard Angell (2014–2018)
Nathan Yeowell (August 2019 –)

References

External links 
 

Labour Party (UK) factions
New Labour
1996 establishments in the United Kingdom
Organisations associated with the Labour Party (UK)
Organisations based in London
Organisations based in the London Borough of Lambeth
Organizations established in 1996
Political advocacy groups in the United Kingdom
Political and economic think tanks based in the United Kingdom
Political organisations based in London
Progressivism in the United Kingdom
Think tanks based in the United Kingdom